Hockey world championships include:

On the ground

Field hockey
 Hockey World Cup
 Women's Hockey World Cup
 Hockey Champions Trophy

Indoor field hockey
 Indoor Hockey World Cup

On ice

Ice hockey
 Ice Hockey World Championships, the most important IIHF international ice-hockey competitions
 World Pond Hockey Championships, playing the pond hockey variant of ice-hockey
 IIHF World U18 Championship, for ice-hockey
 IIHF World Women Championship, for ice-hockey
 IIHF World Women's U18 Championships, for ice hockey
 IIHF World U20 Championship (World Junior Hockey Championship), for ice-hockey
 Ice hockey at the Winter Olympics had world championship status until 1976

Sledge hockey
 IPC Ice Sledge Hockey World Championships, for sledge hockey

Bandy
Bandy is also sometimes called "Russian hockey", "hockey with ball" or "winter football"
 Bandy World Championship
 Women's Bandy World Championship
 Youth Bandy World Championship
 Bandy World Championship G-17
 Bandy World Championship Y-19
 Bandy World Championship Y-23
 Bandy World Cup
 Bandy World Cup Women

On floors

Roller hockey
 Rink Hockey World Championship, for Roller hockey (Quad)
 Ladies Rink Hockey World Championship (CIRH Women's World Cup), for Roller hockey (Quad)
 Rink Hockey World Championship U-20, for Roller hockey (Quad)
 Rink hockey World Club Championship, for Roller hockey (Quad)
 IIHF InLine Hockey World Championship, for Roller hockey (Inline)
 FIRS Men's Inline Hockey World Championship (FIRS World Championships), for Roller hockey (Inline)
 FIRS Inline Hockey World Junior Championships, for Roller hockey (Inline)
 FIRS Inline Hockey World Women Championships, for Roller hockey (Inline)

Floorball
 Floorball World Championships

On table tops

Table hockey
 World Championship/s, for ITHF table hockey
 World Women Championship/s, for ITHF table hockey
 World Junior Championship/s, for ITHF table hockey
 World Veteran/Senior Championship/s, for ITHF table hockey
 World Men's Team Championship, for ITHF table hockey
 World Women's Team Championship, for ITHF table hockey
 World Club Championship, for ITHF table hockey

Air hockey
 World Championships, for air hockey

See also
Ice hockey at the Olympic Games
 Field hockey at the Summer Olympics
World Cup

World championships
World championships